Venus Williams defeated Lindsay Davenport in the final, 4–6, 7–6(7–4), 9–7 to win the ladies' singles tennis title at the 2005 Wimbledon Championships. It was her third Wimbledon singles title and fifth major singles title overall. At two hours and 45 minutes, it was the longest Wimbledon women's final in history. Williams became the first woman in the Open Era, and the first since Helen Wills in 1935, to win the title after saving a championship point. She lost only one set during the tournament, to Davenport in the final — which was a rematch of the 2000 final.

Maria Sharapova was the defending champion, but lost to Venus Williams in the semifinals.

The first week of the tournament was headlined by two major upsets — Justine Henin-Hardenne's first round defeat marked the first time in the Open Era that the reigning French Open champion lost her opening match at Wimbledon, while Serena Williams's loss in the third round was her earliest exit at any major since the 1999 French Open.

Seeds

  Lindsay Davenport (final)
  Maria Sharapova (semifinals)
  Amélie Mauresmo (semifinals)
  Serena Williams (third round)
  Svetlana Kuznetsova (quarterfinals)
  Elena Dementieva (fourth round)
  Justine Henin-Hardenne (first round)
  Nadia Petrova (quarterfinals)
  Anastasia Myskina (quarterfinals)
  Patty Schnyder (first round)
  Vera Zvonareva (second round)
  Mary Pierce (quarterfinals)
  Elena Likhovtseva (fourth round)
  Venus Williams (champion)
  Kim Clijsters (fourth round)
  Nathalie Dechy (fourth round)

  Jelena Janković (third round)
  Tatiana Golovin (first round)
  Ana Ivanovic (third round)
  Daniela Hantuchová (third round)
  Francesca Schiavone (first round)
  Silvia Farina Elia (third round)
  Ai Sugiyama (first round)
  Shinobu Asagoe (first round)
  Karolina Šprem (first round)
  Flavia Pennetta (fourth round)
  Nicole Vaidišová (third round)
  Amy Frazier (first round)
  Marion Bartoli (second round)
  Dinara Safina (third round)
  Anabel Medina Garrigues (first round)
  Virginie Razzano (second round)

Qualifying

Draw

Finals

Top half

Section 1

Section 2

Section 3

Section 4

Bottom half

Section 5

Section 6

Section 7

Section 8

Championship match statistics

References

External links

2005 Wimbledon Championships on WTAtennis.com
2005 Wimbledon Championships – Women's draws and results at the International Tennis Federation

Women's Singles
Wimbledon Championship by year – Women's singles
Wimbledon Championships
Wimbledon Championships